Warren Reynolds "Ray" Walker (August 10, 1904 – October 6, 1980) was an American actor, born  in Newark, New Jersey, who starred in Baby Take a Bow (1934), Hideaway Girl (1936), The Dark Hour (1936), The Unknown Guest (1943) and It's A Wonderful Life (1946).

Death
Ray Walker died in Los Angeles, California, on October 6, 1980, at age 76.

Partial filmography

 Goodbye Love (1933) as Brooks
 Devil's Mate (1933) as Natural
 Skyway (1933) as Robert 'Flash' Norris
 He Couldn't Take It (1933) as Jimmy Case
 Million Dollar Baby (1934) as Terry Sweeney
 One Hour Late (1934) as Cliff Miller
 When Strangers Meet (1934) as Steve
 Happy Landing (1934) as Lt. Nick Terris
 Baby Take a Bow (1934) as Larry Scott
 The Loudspeaker (1934) as Joe Miller
 Thirty Day Princess (1934) as Dan Kirk
 City Limits (1934) as Jimmy Dugan
 The Fighting Coward (1935) as Bob Horton
 Music Is Magic (1935) as Jack Lambert
 The Girl Friend (1935) as Doc Parks
 Cappy Ricks Returns (1935) as Bill Peck
 Ladies Love Danger (1935) as Haskins
 $10 Raise (1935) as Perry aka $10 Raise
 Hideaway Girl (1936) as Freddie
 Bulldog Edition (1936) as Ken Dwyer
 The Crime Patrol (1936) as Bob Neal
 Brilliant Marriage (1936) as Garry Dane
 Laughing Irish Eyes (1936) as Eddie Bell
 The Dark Hour (1936) as Jim Landis
 It's Up to You (1936) as Sam Jones
 Big Town Girl (1937) as Norton (uncredited)
 Hot Water (1937) as Reporter (uncredited)
 Big City (1937) as Eddie Donogan - Independent Cab Driver (uncredited)
 Outlaws of the Orient (1937) as Lucky Phelps
 One Mile from Heaven (1937) as Mortimer (Buck) Atlas
 Angel's Holiday (1937) as Crandall
 Her Husband Lies (1937) as Maxie
 Crashing Through Danger (1938) as Torchy
 Swing That Cheer (1938) as Reporter (uncredited)
 Too Hot to Handle (1938) as Wally - Sound Mixer (uncredited)
 Letter of Introduction (1938) as Reporter (uncredited)
 The Crowd Roars (1938) as Photographer (uncredited)
 The Marines Are Here (1938) as Hogan
 Test Pilot (1938) as Pilot in Café (uncredited)
 The Marines Are Here (1938) as Hogan
 Missing Evidence (1939) as McBride
 The Forgotten Woman (1939) as Marty Larkin
 It's a Wonderful World (1939) as Newspaper Man at Ferry Landing (uncredited)
 Tell No Tales (1939) as 'Mac' Dell (uncredited)
 Broadway Serenade (1939) as Denny Madison (uncredited)
 Mr. Moto in Danger Island (1939) as Ambulance Intern (uncredited)
 Let Us Live (1939) as Drunken Reporter (uncredited)
 Pardon Our Nerve (1939) as Publicity Man (uncredited)
 Pirates of the Skies (1939) as Pilot Hal Weston
 Isle of Destiny (1940) as Cpl. Jones aka Jonesy Radio Man
 New Moon (1940) as Coco (uncredited)
 A Night at Earl Carroll's (1940) as Jerry
 It Started with Eve (1941) as Slim – Reporter (uncredited)
 Three Girls About Town (1941) as Reporter on Telephone (uncredited)
 Marry the Boss's Daughter (1941) as Elevator Operator (uncredited)
 Pittsburgh (1942) as Sutcliff (uncredited)
 My Heart Belongs to Daddy (1942) as Eddie Summers – Band Leader
 The Spirit of Stanford (1942) as Duke Connors (uncredited)
 Get Hep to Love (1942) as Gas Station Attendant (uncredited)
 Henry Aldrich, Editor (1942) as Jack Lewis
 Footlight Serenade (1942) as Reporter (uncredited)
 Almost Married (1942) as Blakeley
 House of Errors (1942) as Jerry Fitzgerald
 What's Cookin'? (1942) as Happy (uncredited)
 Captains of the Clouds (1942) as Mason
 The Lady Is Willing (1942) as Reporter (uncredited)
 Dr. Kildare's Victory (1942) as Taxi Driver with Injured Man (uncredited)
 Brooklyn Orchid (1942) as Orchestra Leader/Emcee
 Don't Get Personal (1942) as Pitchman
 Lost Angel (1943) as Trainer (uncredited)
 Swing Out the Blues (1943) as Announcer (uncredited)
 Swingtime Johnny (1944) as Mike
 Government Girl (1944) as Tom Holliday
 There's Something About a Soldier (1943) as Sports Writer (uncredited)
 Henry Aldrich Haunts a House (1943) as Detective Beamish (uncredited)
 Is Everybody Happy? (1943) as Lou Merwin
 Princess O'Rourke (1943) as G-Man
 The Unknown Guest (1943) as Swarthy
 Crazy House (1943) as Radio Host at Drive-In (uncredited)
 Hi'ya, Sailor (1943) as Headwaiter (uncredited)
 Captive Wild Woman (1943) as Ringmaster (uncredited)
 It's a Great Life (1943) as Salesman (uncredited)
 Mission to Moscow (1943) as Raymond - Davies' Butler (uncredited)
 He Hired the Boss (1943) as Salesman (uncredited)
 Dixie Dugan (1943) as Burns (uncredited)
 Hi'ya Chum (1943) as Jackson
 The Amazing Mrs. Holliday (1943 as Chauffeur (uncredited)
 Rogues' Gallery (1944) as Jimmy Foster
 My Buddy (1944) as Russ
 Kansas City Kitty (1944) as Lawyer Simpson
 Maisie Goes to Reno (1944) as Bus Ticket Clerk
 Wing and a Prayer (1944) as Sailor assisting Projectionist
 South of Dixie (1944) as Newspaper Reporter
 Man from Frisco (1944) as Johnny Rogers
 Silent Partner (1944) as Reilly, the Drunk
 Stars on Parade (1944) as Billy Blake
 Jam Session (1944) as Fred Wylie
 Her Primitive Man (1944) as Radio Announcer (uncredited)
 Hat Check Honey (1944) as Gabby Post
 Life with Blondie (1945) as Anthony – Apex Photographer (uncredited)
 She Wouldn't Say Yes (1945) as Doctor (uncredited)
 Secrets of a Sorority Girl (1945) as Whitney King
 Radio Stars on Parade (1945) as Phil Merivin (uncredited)
 Incendiary Blonde (1945) as Gus – Stage Manager (uncredited)
 Eve Knew Her Apples (1945) as George McGrew
 Patrick the Great (1945) as Orchestra Leader (uncredited)
 The Beast with Five Fingers (1946) as Mr. Miller
 It's a Wonderful Life (1946) as Joe (Luggage Shop)
 The Secret of the Whistler (1946) as Joseph Aloysius 'Joe' Conroy
 Sister Kenny (1946) as Doctor at Minneapolis Lecture (uncredited)
 Step by Step (1946) as Agent Jorgensen
 Earl Carroll Sketchbook (1946) as Agent Sammy Harris (uncredited)
 Boys' Ranch (1946) as Casey, Baseball Manager (uncredited)
 Dark Alibi (1946) as Danvers
 Crime of the Century (1946) as Jim Rogers
 Gay Blades (1946) as Bill Calhoun
 Because of Him (1946) as Daniels (uncredited)
 Girl on the Spot (1946) as Don Dawson (uncredited)
 Tars and Spars (1946) as Lt. Scully (uncredited)
 Magic Town (1947) as Stinger's Associate (uncredited)
 The Unsuspected (1947) as Donovan's Assistant
 Robin Hood of Texas (1947) as Detective Lt. Lacey
 The Perils of Pauline (1947) as Armistice Day Set Technician (uncredited)
 That's My Man (1947) as Gambler (uncredited)
 That's My Gal (1947) as Danny Malone
 The Guilt of Janet Ames (1947) as Sidney (uncredited)
 The Pilgrim Lady (1947) as Blackie Reynolds
 The Return of October (1948) as Joe (uncredited)
 Apartment for Peggy (1948) as Carson (uncredited)
 Fighting Father Dunne (1948) as Fred Carver – Off-Screen Storyteller (uncredited)
 The Sainted Sisters (1948) as Abel Rivercomb
 April Showers (1948) as Mr. Barclay (uncredited)
 Black Bart (1948) as MacFarland
 Angels in Disguise (1949) as City Editor, Jim Cobb
 Mighty Joe Young (1949) as Reporter (uncredited)
 The Great Gatsby (1949) as Real Estate Man
 Blondie's Big Deal (1949) as Harry Slack
 Bodyhold (1949) as Prof. Weaver
 Pioneer Marshal (1949) as Harvey Masters
 Adam's Rib (1949) as Photographer (uncredited)
 Chinatown at Midnight (1949) as Sam Costa
 Oh, You Beautiful Doll (1949) as Box Office Attendant
 Song of Surrender (1949) as Auctioneer
 Holiday in Havana (1949) as Sam Keegan
 The House Across the Street (1949) as Lt. Forman (uncredited)
 Hunt the Man Down (1950) as Mac (uncredited)
 Revenue Agent (1950) as Lt. Bob Ullman
 Mr. Music (1950) as Master of Ceremonies (uncredited)
 Under Mexicali Stars (1950) as Robert B. Handley
 Southside 1-1000 (1950) as Secret Service Chemist (uncredited)
 Woman on the Run (1950) as Piano Player (uncredited)
 The Killer That Stalked New York (1950) as Wise Guy (uncredited)
 A Life of Her Own (1950) as Birthday Party Guest (uncredited)
 Sideshow (1950) as Sam Owen
 Hoedown (1950) as Knoxie (uncredited)
 Square Dance Katy (1950) as Businessman
 Captain Carey, U.S.A. (1950) as Mr. Simmons
 No Man of Her Own (1950) as Plainclothesman (uncredited)
 Joe Palooka Meets Humphrey (1950) as Lefty
 Superman and the Mole Men (1951) as John Craig
 Too Young to Kiss (1951) as New York Mail Reporter (uncredited)
 The Raging Tide (1951) as Neil (uncredited)
 Drums in the Deep South (1951) as Union Officer (uncredited)
 Let's Go Navy! (1951) as Lt. Bradley
 The Harlem Globetrotters (1951) as Jack Davis (uncredited)
 Skipalong Rosenbloom (1951) as TV Announcer
 M (1951) as Detective (uncredited)
 The Bad and the Beautiful (1952) as Cameraman (uncredited)
 No Holds Barred (1952) as Max, the Fake Reporter
 Battle Zone (1952) as Colonel (uncredited)
 The Las Vegas Story (1952) as Mary's Father (uncredited)
 The Fighter (1952) as Fan (uncredited)
 Boots Malone (1952) as Better (uncredited)
 Marry Me Again (1953) as Mac
 Clipped Wings (1953) as Sgt. Pete Whitney
 Roar of the Crowd (1953) as Tuffy Adams
 Rebel City (1953) as Col. Barnes
 The Homesteaders (1953) as Colonel Peterson
 The Blue Gardenia (1953) as Homer
 She's Back on Broadway (1953) as Beverly Hills Guide Bus Driver (uncredited)
 The Atomic Kid (1954) as Newspaperman
 Pride of the Blue Grass (1954) as Veterinarian
 Francis in the Navy (1955) as Auctioneer 
 Jail Busters (1955) as Willie (uncredited)
 Sincerely Yours (1955) as Night Club Emcee/Band Leader
 Miracle in the Rain (1956) as Mr. McGuire, Salesman
 Somebody Up There Likes Me (1956) as Zale Ring Announcer
 Yaqui Drums (1956) as Sheriff
 Everything But the Truth (1956) as Doctor
 Hot Shots (1956) as Police Capt. W. K. Wells
 The Iron Sheriff (1957) as Bilson
 Kelly and Me (1957) as Bill Nevins
 Footsteps in the Night (1957) as McCleary
 The Spirit in St. Louis (1957) as Barker
 This Could Be the Night (1957) as Emcee at Cooking Contest
 The Space Children (1958) as Reporter Richard Lloyd
 Elmer Gantry (1960) as Salesman in Saloon 
 Ten Who Dared (1960) as McSpalden
 Pepe (1960) as Wilder's Assistant Director
 Walk on the Wild Side (1962) as Salesman in Teresina Café
 Kisses for My President (1964) as Ray - Assistant TV Crew Producer

References

External links

1904 births
1980 deaths
20th-century American male actors
American male film actors